Sambhal district is a district of Uttar Pradesh state in India. The district headquarter is Bahjoi town. 993 Villages and 16 Police stations fall under Sambhal district.

History

The district was announced on 28 September 2011 and created by the state government on 23 July 2012 as one of three new districts in the state. At the time of its creation, the state government decided to name the new district "Bhimnagar" in honour of the social reformer, Bhimrao Ambedkar. However, massive protests broke out in Sambhal town and the adjoining rural areas against the move to give a new name to the ancient town. Sambhal had been known by the same name for over five hundred years, had been an important town in medieval India, and had never had any connection with Bhimrao Ambedkar, a Dalit icon. The protests against renaming the town were successful and the government had to revert to the old name of Sambhal.

Geography
The district of Sambhal is part of the Moradabad division in the state of Uttar Pradesh. Bahjoi town serves as its district headquarters. The districts which adjoin Sambhal are (clockwise from north) Amroha, Moradabad, Rampur, Badaun, Aligarh and Bulandshahr.

The nearest major metropolis is New Delhi. Sambhal lies  due east from New Delhi, past Ghaziabad, Noida and Hapur. The driving time from New Delhi is about 2 hours 40 minutes. Sambhal lies 355 km north-west from the state capital Lucknow.

Administrative divisions
Sambhal district is a part of Moradabad Division. This district is divided into three tehsils: Sambhal, Chandausi, and Gunnaur.

Sambhal district has a single Lok Sabha constituency, the Sambhal constituency. Sambhal district has four Uttar Pradesh Legislative Assembly constituencies:
Sambhal, Asmoli, Chandausi and Gunnaur.

Demographics
As per 2011 census, Sambhal district had a population of 2,199,774. The sex ratio as per the census was 891 females for every 1000 males. Literacy rate of Sambhal district is 55%. Scheduled Castes make up 364,286 (16.56%) of the population.

Hindus are in majority in the district. Muslims are majority in Sambhal tehsil and dominate urban areas.

At the time of the 2011 Census of India, 80.90% of the population of the district spoke Hindi and 18.57% Urdu as their first language.

Education

Schools
Madrasa Sirajul Uloom Hilali Sarai Sambhal

Colleges
Government Degree College Sambhal
Mahatma Gandhi Memorial Post Graduate College

Nearby districts
Amroha district
Moradabad 
Rampur
Badaun
Aligarh
Bulandshahr

References

External links

 
 http://www.sambhalnews.in/2014/09/about-dream-city-sambhal.html
 http://www.sambhalnews.in/2018/01/the-hm-global-school-sambhal.html
 https://www.sambhalnews.in/2019/04/Janab-Babu-Irfan-Husain-Babu-Ji-has-passed-away-on-5-April-2019.html

 
Districts of Uttar Pradesh